Bas-Uélé (French for "Lower Uélé") is one of the 21 new provinces of the Democratic Republic of the Congo created in the 2015 repartitioning. Bas-Uélé, Haut-Uélé, Ituri, and Tshopo provinces are the result of the dismemberment of the former Orientale Province.  Bas-Uélé was formed from the Bas-Uele District whose town of Buta was elevated to capital city of the new province.

Administration

Bas-Uélé lies in the north-east of the DRC on the Uélé River (the French name for the province means "Lower Uélé").
The province includes the following territories:
Aketi
Ango
Bambesa
Bondo
Buta
Poko

People
Most of the inhabitants of the Bas-Uélé Province, with a population of 900,000 in 2007, are Azandé people. There are others peoples like the Boa, Bakere, Balele, Bakango, Babenza, etc., are also present in this province. 
They live mainly through subsistence farming and hunting, with some river commerce.

Ebola 

Three people have been reported dead and six suspected with the Ebola virus. The nation has declared an Ebola outbreak. Since the authentic announcement of the epidemic by using the country’s Ministry of Health on 12 May, two person have been declared Ebola-positive, one died from the disease. In order to forestall the unfold of the disease, all human beings with hemorrhagic fever are being tracked, their blood analyzed, and the fitness state of affairs of all human beings who had been in contact with a suspected case are intently monitored.

Sources

References

 
Provinces of the Democratic Republic of the Congo